Via Júlia is a Barcelona Metro station, on L4. It opened in  but didn't take its current name until 1999; before then it was known as Roquetes (name recently retaken by another station). It's located in the Roquetes area of the Nou Barris district, underneath Via Júlia, an important road in the area, between two streets: Carrer de Joaquim Valls and Carrer d'Argullós and can be accessed from both sides of the road.

Services

See also
List of Barcelona Metro stations

External links

Trenscat.com

Railway stations in Spain opened in 1982
Transport in Nou Barris
Barcelona Metro line 4 stations